Camryn Grimes (born January 7, 1990) is an American actress.

Career 
She played Cassie Newman on The Young and the Restless starting in 1997. In 2000, at age 10, she became the youngest winner ever of the Daytime Emmy Award for Outstanding Younger Actress in a Drama Series; Kimberly McCullough had won the award ten years earlier, at age 11. In May 2005, Grimes's character was written off the show when she died from injuries sustained in a car accident. Since departing the show, she has made several guest appearances as Cassie's spirit. In 2014, she began a new role on the series, playing a woman with a resemblance to Cassie, named Mariah Copeland, later revealed to be Cassie's twin sister. It was announced on May 5, 2014, that Grimes was put on contract with The Young and the Restless.

Grimes played the part of Holly in the 2001 film Swordfish alongside Hugh Jackman, Halle Berry, and John Travolta.  She guest-starred on Medium, JAG,  NCIS , and ER.

Personal life 
Grimes is the daughter of Preston Lee and Heather Grimes and the niece of actor Scott Grimes. She is the oldest of seven children.

Filmography

Awards and nominations

References

External links 

Living people
1990 births
20th-century American actresses
21st-century American actresses
Actresses from California
American film actresses
American child actresses
American soap opera actresses
American television actresses
Bisexual actresses
Daytime Emmy Award winners
Daytime Emmy Award for Outstanding Supporting Actress in a Drama Series winners
Daytime Emmy Award for Outstanding Younger Actress in a Drama Series winners
American LGBT actors
People from Van Nuys, Los Angeles
21st-century LGBT people